Zdv or ZDV may refer to:

ZDV, an air traffic control center in the United States
Zentral-Dombauverein zu Köln von 1842, a civic association of Germany
Zero-day vulnerability
Zidovudine, an antiretroviral drug